Intrépide was intended to be one of five second-rank, 90-gun, steam-powered  ships of the line built for the French Navy in the 1850s, but her construction was suspended for many years before she was converted into a troopship in 1863. The ship evacuated French troops in 1866–1867 after the defeat of Second French intervention in Mexico. Intrépide became a school ship in 1883 and was renamed Borda in 1890. She was withdrawn from service in 1912 and sank by accident the following year. The ship was scrapped in place from 1913 to 1922.

Description
The Algésiras-class ships were repeats of the pioneering ship of the line  and were also designed by naval architect Henri Dupuy de Lôme.

The primary difference between Napoléon and the Algésiras class was that the boilers of the latter ships were moved forward of the engines. They were powered by a pair of trunk steam engines that drove the single propeller shaft using steam provided by eight boilers. The engines were rated at 900 nominal horsepower and produced . To accommodate her troops, Intrépide was only armed with four 30-pounder  cannon.

Career 
Under Captain Claude Gennet, Intrépide was used as a troopship to bring the expeditionary corps of the French intervention in Mexico back to France in 1866–1867. She took part in the Siege of Sfax in 1881. From 1883, she was a school ship of the École navale, and from 1887 she was hulked as barracks. Renamed Borda in 1890, she was used again by the École navale, and was eventually broken up in 1921.

Citations

References

Ships of the line of the French Navy
Algésiras-class ships of the line
1864 ships
Ships built in France
Napoléon-class ships of the line
Second French intervention in Mexico